Queenie is a 1921 American silent drama film directed by Howard M. Mitchell and starring Shirley Mason, George O'Hara and Adolphe Menjou.

Cast
 Shirley Mason as Queenie Gurkin
 George O'Hara as Vivan Van Winkle
 Clarence Wilson as Simon Pepper / Abner Quigley
 Aggie Herring as Pansy Pooley
 Lydia Yeamans Titus as Mrs. Mulliken 
 Adolphe Menjou as Count Michael
 Clarissa Selwynne as Mrs. Torrence

References

Bibliography
 Munden, Kenneth White. The American Film Institute Catalog of Motion Pictures Produced in the United States, Part 1. University of California Press, 1997.

External links
 

1921 films
1921 comedy films
American silent feature films
American comedy films
American black-and-white films
Films directed by Howard M. Mitchell
Fox Film films
1920s English-language films
1920s American films
Silent American comedy films